William Henry Heames (July 1869 – 1939) was an English footballer who played in the Football League for Burslem Port Vale and Stoke. A left-winger, he had an eleven-year career, scoring 28 goals in 249 games in all competitions. His sole honour was a Staffordshire Senior Cup win with Vale in 1898.

Career
Heames played for Middleport Athletic before he joined Stoke in 1893. He made his debut in the Football League in a 4–1 defeat at Sheffield Wednesday on 7 December 1894. This was only appearance in the 1893–94 campaign before he forced his way into the side at the start of the 1894–95 season, making ten appearances at outside-left. However Joe Schofield swapped wings and Heames fell out of favour. He scored his first senior goal on 17 November 1894, in a 4–2 defeat by Small Heath at Muntz Street. He featured just twice in 1895–96, scoring one goal in a 5–0 win over Sunderland at the Victoria Ground. He was limited to three First Division appearances in 1896–97.

Heames joined nearby Midland League side Burslem Port Vale in the summer of 1897. He was a member of the side that lifted the Staffordshire Senior Cup in 1898. At the end of the season the club was re-admitted into the Second Division. He went on to make 43 appearances in the 1898–99 season, scoring once in a 1–1 draw with Manchester City at the Athletic Ground. He hit eight goals in 39 games in 1899–1900, and then three goals in 36 games in 1900–01. He scored five goals in 38 appearances in 1901–02, including goals against Woolwich Arsenal and Newton Heath (later renamed Manchester United). Heames scored twice in 35 games in 1902–03 and four times in 38 games in 1903–04 but refused to re-sign for the club in the summer of 1904, thus leaving the club after amassing 254 appearances (191 in the football league) and 28 goals (18 in the football league).

Career statistics
Source:

Note Not including Staffordshire Senior Cup or Birmingham Senior Cup appearances.

Honours
Burslem Port Vale
Staffordshire Senior Cup: 1898

References

1869 births
1939 deaths
Footballers from Staffordshire
Association football wingers
English footballers
Stoke City F.C. players
Port Vale F.C. players
English Football League players